El último rey is a Mexican biographical drama television series that aired on Las Estrellas from 14 March 2022 to 10 June 2022. The series is produced by Juan Osorio for TelevisaUnivision. It is based on the book of the same name that journalist Olga Wornat wrote about Vicente Fernández's life. Pablo Montero stars as Vicente Fernández.

The series has been renewed for a second season, that premiered on 16 May 2022.

Premise 
El último rey narrates the life of a Vicente Fernandez and how he overcome all obstacles to achieve his dream: to become one of the greatest representatives of regional Mexican music.

Cast

Main 
 Angélica Aragón as Dalia
 Pablo Montero as Vicente Fernández
 Salvador Sánchez as Old Vicente Fernández
 Eduardo Narajas as Young Vicente Fernández
 Moisés Habib Buchard as Child Vicente Fernández
 Iliana Fox as María del Refugio Abarca Villaseñor "Doña Cuquita"
 Jade Fraser as Young Cuquita
 Paloma Woolrich as Old Cuquita
 Jesús Moré as Gerardo Fernández
 Paolo Vargas as Young Gerardo Fernández
 Iván Arana as Vicente Fernández Jr.
 Alonso Meza as Young Vicente Fernández Jr.
 Emilio Osorio as Young Alejandro Fernández / Alex Fernández
 Vince Miranda as Adult Alejandro Fernández

Recurring 
 César Évora as Francisco Manjarrez
 Sara Corrales as Patricia Rivera
 Alejandra Ambrosi as Paula Gómez
 Ligia Uriarte as Sissi
 Antonio López as Ramón
 Eva Daniela as Chicotita
 José Daniel Figueroa as Adult Felipe
 Alejandro Sandi as Federico Méndez
 Rossana de León as Lucha Villa
 Karla Garrido as La India María
 José Alfredo Jiménez
 Flor Yáñez as Alicia Juárez
 Ana Tena as Alejandra
 Carlos Balderrama
 Waldo Franco
 Carlos Kapistrán

Production

Development 
The series was announced by TelevisaUnivision on 13 January 2022. Filming began in late January 2022. The first teaser of the series was shown on 17 February 2022. On 16 March 2022, Juan Osorio announced that the series was renewed for a second season that will consist of 20 episodes.

Controversy 
On 11 March 2022, three days before the series scheduled premiere date, it was announced that a federal judge had ordered for the series to be postponed after the family of Vicente Fernandez alleged that Televisa incurred in violations of non-contractual relationships; trademark rights; improper use of an artistic name reserved before the National Copyright Institute (Indautor); unfair competition, among other reasons. The following day, TelevisaUnivision alleged that the company had not received any judicial notice prohibiting the series from airing and would continue with airing the series. The series went on to premiere as scheduled.

Ratings

Episodes

Series overview

Season 1 (2022)

Season 2 (2022)

References

External links 
 

2022 Mexican television series debuts
2022 Mexican television series endings
Mexican drama television series
Las Estrellas original programming
Television series by Televisa
Spanish-language television shows
Biographical television series